Duttaphrynus himalayanus, also known as the Himalaya toad, Himalayan toad, Himalayan broad-skulled toad, and Günther's high altitude toad (among others), is a species of toad that is widely distributed throughout the Himalayan mountains. The Yunnanese populations are sometimes considered a separate species, Duttaphrynus cyphosus.

Description

The crown is deeply concave, with low, blunt supraorbital ridges. The snout is short and blunt, the interorbital space is broader than the upper eyelid, and the tympanum is very small and rather indistinct. The first finger does not extend beyond the second, the toes are half or two-thirds webbed, with single subarticular tubercles, two moderate metatarsal tubercles, and no tarsal fold. The tarsometatarsal articulation reaches the anterior border of the eye or the tip of the snout. Upper parts have irregular, distinctly porous warts, the parotoids are very prominent, large, and elongated, at least as long as the head. They are uniform brown in color. Males do not have vocal sacs.

From snout to vent, they measure .

Distribution and habitat
This species is found from Azad Kashmir in Pakistan through northern India and adjacent Bangladesh, Bhutan, and Nepal to southern and central Tibet and northwestern Yunnan in China. Its range might extend into Myanmar. It inhabits mountain forests and shrubland near streams, and also is found in the vicinity of seepages and fields. This high-altitude species can also occur in the evergreen forests of the foothills.It is largely a terrestrial toad. Breeding takes place in hill streams, small pools, and puddles.

References

himalayanus
Amphibians of Bangladesh
Amphibians of Bhutan
Frogs of China
Frogs of India
Amphibians of Nepal
Amphibians of Pakistan
Fauna of Tibet
Amphibians described in 1864
Taxa named by Albert Günther